Machine element or hardware refers to an elementary component of a machine.  These elements consist of three basic types:
 structural components such as frame members, bearings, axles, splines, fasteners, seals, and lubricants, 
 mechanisms that control movement in various ways such as gear trains, belt or chain drives, linkages, cam and follower systems, including brakes and clutches, and 
 control components such as buttons, switches, indicators, sensors, actuators and computer controllers.  

While generally not considered to be a machine element, the shape, texture and color of covers are an important part of a machine that provide a styling and operational interface between the mechanical components of a machine and its users.

Machine elements are basic mechanical parts and features used as the building blocks of most machines. Most are standardized to common sizes, but customs are also common for specialized applications. 

Machine elements may be features of a part (such as screw threads or integral plain bearings) or they may be discrete parts in and of themselves such as wheels, axles, pulleys, rolling-element bearings, or gears. All of the simple machines may be described as machine elements, and many machine elements incorporate concepts of one or more simple machines.  For example, a leadscrew incorporates a screw thread, which is an inclined plane wrapped around a cylinder. 

Many mechanical design, invention, and engineering tasks involve a knowledge of various machine elements and an intelligent and creative combining of these elements into a component or assembly that fills a need (serves an application).

Structural elements
 Beams, Struts
 Bearings
 Fasteners
 Keys, Splines and Cotter pin
 Seals
 Machine guardings

Mechanical elements
 Engine, Electric motor, Actuator
 Shafts
 Couplings
 Belt, Chain, Cable drives
 Gear train
 Clutch
 Brake
 Flywheel
 Cam and follower systems
 Linkage
 Simple machine

Types

Shafts
Coupling
Key
Spline
Bearing
Roller bearing
Plain bearing
Thrust bearing
Ball bearing
Linear bearing
Pillow block  
Gears
Spur gear
Helical gear
Worm gear
Herringbone gear
Fastener
Screw
Screw thread
Nut
Clevis fastener
Retaining ring
Circlip
E-ring
Split pin cotter pin)
Linchpin
R-clip
Rivet
Tapered pin
O-ring
Belt
Pulleys
Clutch
Brake
Chain
Sprocket
Wire rope
Power screw

References

External links

Hardware (mechanical)
Machines
Mechanical engineering